Gade people also known as Babye people are one of the ethnic groups in Nigeria. They can be found in Niger State, Federal Capital Territory (Abuja) and Nassarawa.

Origin 

The word "Gade" originated from the distorted version of Ngade which means I said. It was corrupted by the Hausa speakers who wanted to differentiate between Gade and Mazugawe.  Gade's people can be traced to a farming tribe called Adakpu. They migrated from   the Congo-Niger Basin through Sudan to Kano in search for a fertile land to farm in 1068 AD during the era of Tsamiya (Emir of Kano).  In Kano, they occupied Gadawur territory which is known as the present day Jigawa State.

However, the death of their leader, Gakingakuma, led to the dispersal of the tribe to different territories. Currently, the Gade people are located in Abuja, Niger and Nasarawa States.

Occupation 
Gade's men are known for farming and hunting while women are known for basket weaving and clothes making.

Language 

Gade people speak Gade language.

Annual Gade Cultural Festival 
This is an annual festival where the Gade people from far and near gathered to celebrate their culture and belief.

The festival involves the display of cultural antiquities such as;

Adakpu Masquerade 
It is usually the first masquerade to be displayed because of its symbolic attribution to the historical migration of the Gade people from Congo-Niger Basin.

Egede war dancers' masquerades  
Symbolic war dacing masquerades that are used to either announce a coming war or to celebrate war victory.

Zurunuba Masquerade 
It is the strongest masquerade among the Gade people. His power is drawn from his energetic dancing display.

References 

Ethnic groups in Nigeria
Niger State
Abuja
Nasarawa State